Five Minutes to Live is a 1961 American neo-noir crime film directed by Bill Karn. It was re-titled Door-to-Door Maniac for an American International Pictures re-release in 1966. The film stars Johnny Cash, who wrote and sang the title song, and Cay Forrester, who wrote the screenplay and whose husband, Ludlow Flower, produced.

Five Minutes to Live was one of only two theatrical film roles in which Cash performed on-screen in his career (while he appeared in The Road to Nashville six years later, it was as himself in a musical; A Gunfight, ten years later, was the other); he would appear in several made-for-television films and do some voice-over work in film later in his career.

Plot

Fred sits in a dark room, detailing his most recent bank robbery. He talks about how he teamed up with hardened criminal Johnny Cabot to execute his plan.

Cabot is about to take the wife of the bank's vice president hostage. He holds her until he receives a call from Fred, informing him that they have the ransom money. Cabot watches the Wilson house as the husband leaves for work, and their son heads off to school. Posing as a door-to-door guitar instructor, Cabot talks his way into the house, and takes Nancy Wilson hostage.

At the bank, Fred enters vice president Ken Wilson's office, and hands him a check for $70,000, informing Wilson that he will withdraw the funds to cover the ransom or his wife will die. He tells Wilson to call home for proof that Nancy is being held hostage, then informs him that if he does not call Cabot back in five minutes, Mrs. Wilson will die.

Wilson surprisingly responds that he has been planning to leave his wife anyway, and runs off to Las Vegas with his mistress, Ellen. He tells Fred that he will be doing him a favor by killing his wife. Fred does not believe that Wilson will let his wife die. He is proven correct, as time ticks by, when Wilson finally cracks and agrees to pay the ransom.

Fred calls Cabot, and starts the clock over again. After the five minutes have passed, Fred works on Wilson to hurry. Meanwhile, at the Wilson house, Cabot is enjoying terrorizing his hostage. He begins forcing her to listen to his songs about her impending demise, shooting at her and making sexual advances toward her. Back at the bank, Fred has been taken down by the police, who arrived after someone tripped the silent alarm. As a result, Cabot starts to become nervous, having not received his expected call from Fred. Suddenly, Little Bobby comes in, home for lunch.

The police arrive outside the house. In a panic, Cabot grabs Bobby and runs for it, running right into police gunfire. Bobby pretends as though he has been shot in order to encourage Cabot to put him down. After apparently being very upset by the accidental shooting of the young boy, Cabot fires back, and is killed by police. Nancy runs outside to find her son, still alive and well. The film ends with Fred finishing his story to the police, then Mr. Wilson driving to Las Vegas, but with his wife, not his mistress.

Cast
 Johnny Cash as Johnny Cabot
 Donald Woods as Ken Wilson
 Cay Forrester as Nancy Wilson
 Pamela Mason as Ellen Harcourt
 Vic Tayback as Fred Dorella
 Ron Howard as Bobby Wilson (credited as Ronnie Howard)
 Merle Travis as Max
 Midge Ware as Doris Johnson
 Norma Varden as Priscilla Auerbach

Reception

Critical

The movie holds a 50% score on Rotten Tomatoes based on 4 critical reviews, citing a mixed rating. It has since become a cult classic.

Soundtrack
Five Minutes To Live
Written and sung by Johnny Cash
Solo Guitar by Merle Travis

Remake
A proposed remake of the film to be directed by Jan de Bont was announced in 2012.

See also
 List of films featuring home invasions
 List of films in the public domain in the United States

References

External links

 
 
 
 
 
 

1961 films
1960s crime thriller films
1961 independent films
American crime thriller films
American black-and-white films
American independent films
Films about kidnapping
Home invasions in film
American neo-noir films
Articles containing video clips
1960s English-language films
1960s American films